Michael Chang was the defending champion.

Chang successfully defended his title, beating Anders Järryd 7–5, 7–5 in the final.

Seeds

Draw

Finals

Top half

Bottom half

References

 Main Draw

1994 ATP Tour